Skycruiser may refer to:
 Bautek Skycruiser, a German ultralight trike design
 SkyCruiser Autogyro SkyCruiser, a Hungarian autogyro design